Albert George Burr (November 8, 1829 – June 10, 1882) was a United States representative in Congress from the state of Illinois for two terms, the 40th and 41st Congresses (serving from March 4, 1867, until March 3, 1871). He was a member of the Democratic Party.

Biography
He was born near Batavia, New York, on November 8, 1829, the son of George Washington Burr and Phoebe (Sweet) Burr.  His father had left New York for Illinois earlier that year, intending to begin a homestead and then return for his family, but he disappeared under circumstances that were never solved.

Burr's mother moved the family to Sangamon County, Illinois in 1830.  Burr had to begin working as a child in order to help support the family, and his youth included a job in a brickyard and other manual labor.  He was largely self-taught, and after completing his education and receiving his teaching qualification, he taught school for several years in Vandalia.  In 1850, he moved to Winchester, Illinois, where he worked as a merchant and studied law.  He was admitted to the bar in 1856 and commenced practice in Winchester.

A Democrat, he served in the Illinois House of Representatives from 1861 to 1864.  In 1862, he was a delegate to the state constitutional convention.  In 1866 he won election to Congress, and he served two terms, 1867 to 1871.  He did not run for re-election in 1870 and resumed the practice of law in Carrollton.  In June 1870, Burr was elected chairman of the Illinois Democratic State Committee, and he served until 1872.

In 1877, the Seventh District of the Illinois Circuit Court was expanded from two judges to three.  Burr was elected to the new position, and served until his death.

Death and burial
Burr died in Carrollton on June 10, 1882, and was buried at Carrollton City Cemetery.

Family
Burr's first wife was Alicia A. Anderson, with whom he had two children, Louis and Lucy.  After his first wife's death, Burr married Mary Harlan (1837–1913).  They were the parents of three children, Mary, Albert, and William.

References

Sources

Books

External links

Albert G. Burr at The Political Graveyard

Democratic Party members of the Illinois House of Representatives
1829 births
1882 deaths
Democratic Party members of the United States House of Representatives from Illinois
Illinois state court judges
19th-century American politicians
People from Genesee County, New York
People from Winchester, Illinois
People from Carrollton, Illinois
19th-century American judges